Ameen Rihani Museum is a biographical museum in Freike, Lebanon. It is dedicated to the Lebanese-American writer and thinker Ameen Rihani and was established in 1953 by his brother Albert Rihani. It occupies the lower level of the Rihani home.

See also
 List of museums in Lebanon

References

External links
Official site
Three views at 360 degrees inside the Museum of Rihani
Francesco Medici, Il Museo Rihani (Rihani Museum), Centro Studi e Ricerche di Orientalistica, 29 luglio 2013 (article in Italian).

1953 establishments in Lebanon
Museums established in 1953
Biographical museums in Lebanon
Literary museums in Lebanon